Guillermo Ulacia Arnaiz serves as Vice President of Aceralia Corporation Siderurgica SA.

Biography
Arnaiz served as the chief executive officer of Gamesa Corporación Tecnológica from December 1, 2005.  He has previously served as Vice Chairman of General Motors Corp, Spanish unit; he also served as Executive Chairman since July 2006 until October 2009.

Arnaiz worked for 10 years as a Director of flat steel products at Arcelor before becoming Vice President.

Arnaiz serves as Co-Chairman of the Aceralia Management Committee, member of the General Management of the Arbed Group.

References

21st-century Spanish businesspeople
Living people
1954 births
People from Barakaldo
Businesspeople from the Basque Country (autonomous community)
Spanish corporate directors